Egyptian revival decorative arts is a style in Western art, mainly of the early nineteenth century, in which Egyptian motifs were applied to a wide variety of decorative arts objects.

Enthusiasm for the artistic style of Ancient Egypt is generally attributed to the excitement over Napoleon's conquest of Egypt and, in Britain, to Admiral Nelson's defeat of Napoleon at the Battle of the Nile in 1798. Napoleon took a scientific expedition with him to Egypt. Publication of the expedition's work, the Description de l'Égypte, began in 1809 and came out in a series though 1826, inspiring everything from sofas with Sphinxes for legs, to tea sets painted with the pyramids. It was the popularity of the style that was new, Egyptianizing works of art had appeared in scattered European settings from the time of the Renaissance.

The Egyptian Gallery, a private room in the Duchess Street home of connoisseur Thomas Hope to display his Egyptian antiquities, and illustrated in engravings from his meticulous line drawings in his book, Household Furniture and Interior Decoration (1807), were a prime source for the Regency style in British furnishings. The book inspired a generation of fashionable English homeowners to install parlor suites featuring chairs, tables and sofas in shapes that evoked the objects depicted on Egyptian tomb paintings.

Later discoveries prompted further revivals, with the discovery of Tutankhamun's tomb creating an especially large revival in the 1920s. This revival in particular had a sizable influence on the Art Deco movement.

Gallery

See also 
 Egyptian Revival architecture
 Art of ancient Egypt
 Orientalism

Sources 
 Egyptomania; Egypt in Western Art; 1730–1930, Jean-marcel Humbert, Michael Pantazzi and Christiane Ziegler, 1994
 The Egyptian revival : its sources, monuments, and meaning, 1808–1858, Richard G. Carrott, 1978
 The Egyptian Revival: Ancient Egypt as the Inspiration for Design Motifs in the West, James Stevens Curl, 2005
 Household Furniture and Interior Decoration, Thomas Hope, 1807

References

External links

Decorative arts
Visual arts genres
Interior design
Ancient Egypt in the Western imagination